The Urim languages constitute a branch of the Torricelli language family. They are spoken in East Sepik Province, in areas bordering the northeastern corner of Sandaun Province.

Languages
Foley (2018) lists the following languages.

Urim, Urat, Kombio

Vocabulary comparison
The following basic vocabulary words are from Laycock (1968), as cited in the Trans-New Guinea database:

{| class="wikitable sortable"
! gloss !! Urim !! Urat !! Torricelli
|-
! head
| ləŋkəp || ntoh || emen
|-
! ear
| nurkul || kwin || wolep
|-
! eye
| iːkŋ || ampep || yempit
|-
! nose
| ləmp || muhroŋ || wujipen
|-
! tooth
| eːk || asep || nal
|-
! tongue
| milip ||  || yaŋklou
|-
! leg
| neːp || nihip || araiʔ
|-
! louse
| nəmin || ompik || numuk
|-
! dog
| nəmpa || pwat || yimpeu
|-
! bird
| wel || antet || elip
|-
! egg
| haləmpar ||  || yimpwonən
|-
! blood
| waləmpop || wim || yalkup
|-
! bone
| təpmuŋkut || lupuŋ || ləp
|-
! skin
| palək || yahreik || alou
|-
! breast
| maː || ampreip || yimep
|-
! tree
| yoː || lou || lu
|-
! man
| kəmel || mik || eiŋ
|-
! woman
| kiːn || tuwei || injik
|-
! sun
| takəni || nai || awən
|-
! moon
| kanyil || wantihi || iyén
|-
! water
| huw || pənip || wop
|-
! fire
| waːkŋ || nih || yotou
|-
! stone
| weit || yah || əntoʔ
|-
! two
| weːk || hoi || wiyeu
|}

References

 

 
Torricelli Range languages
Languages of East Sepik Province